Abigail J. Thaw (born 1 October 1965) is an English actress.

Early life
Abigail Thaw was born in London to actor John Thaw and his first wife, Sally Alexander, an academic/feminist activist who taught modern history at Goldsmiths College. Her parents divorced in 1968. On her mother's side she has a half-brother (Daniel), and on her father's side she has an elder stepsister (Melanie Jane) and a half-sister (Joanna). Her stepmother is actress Sheila Hancock.

After her parents' divorce in 1968, Abigail was brought up in Pimlico by her mother and her mother's boyfriend, Gareth Stedman Jones. Her father also kept in regular contact. Abigail attended Pimlico Comprehensive. Her mother was involved in the flour-bombing of the 1970 Miss World contest, the story of which is the subject of the 2020 film Misbehaviour.

After school she spent a year in Italy, where she was in a car accident. Returning to England, she decided to attend RADA, where she met her future husband, actor Nigel Whitmey.

Career
Abigail Thaw began her career working in rep at Cheltenham, York, and Salisbury, then performed with the RSC and the Royal Exchange Theatre and Library in Manchester, Chichester, The Tricycle, The Gate, Theatre503, The Orange Tree, Battersea Arts Centre, New End, The Finborough, Birmingham, Theatr Clwyd, Watford and extensive touring in Whipping It Up, Ladies in Lavender and Entertaining Angels. She played Ms Capulet in Tom Morris' Juliet and her Romeo at the Bristol Old Vic, and acted in Cymbeline with Mark Rylance at The Globe Theatre and Brooklyn Academy of Music. She also spent a year working with Mike Alfred's company, "Method and Madness", performing in Private Lives, Jude the Obscure and Flesh and Blood. She was nominated for the Best Actress Off West End award in 2011 for The Firewatchers at the Old Red Lion. In early 2015, she participated in the world premiere of Michael Hastings' The Cutting of the Cloth.

Thaw has also worked in television since 1990, including in The Bill, Casualty, Pie in the Sky, Peak Practice, Spywatch, Big Bad World, Vanity Fair, Love Soup and Trust. In 2009 she appeared in the Midsomer Murders episode “Small Mercies” as Annabel Johnson; and the Agatha Christie's Poirot episode “The Clocks”. She also performed in the 2016 BBC comedy series I Want My Wife Back.

She played a newspaper editor in the ITV1 2011 Christmas special edition of the Inspector Morse prequel, Endeavour, a role she continued in Series 1, and in subsequent series.

In 2014, Thaw appeared as a shaman in The Inbetweeners 2.

Personal life
Thaw met Nigel Whitmey at RADA in the mid-1980s, and they married in 1986. In 1997 she gave birth to a daughter, Molly-Mae Whitmey, and in 2003 to her second daughter, Talia. The family live in Muswell Hill, North London.Her daughter Molly had a cameo as the younger version of her grandmother Sally Alexander in the Endeavour episode "Oracle" (series 7, episode 1, broadcast February 1, 2020).

Filmography

Film

Television

Theatre credits

References

External links
 
 

1965 births
Living people
People from Pimlico
Alumni of RADA
English stage actresses
English television actresses